West Huntspill is a settlement and civil parish about 5 miles from Bridgwater, in the Sedgemoor district, in the county of Somerset, England. The parish includes the village of Huntspill and the hamlet of Alstone. In 2011 the parish had a population of 1414. The parish touches Burnham-on-Sea and Highbridge, East Huntspill, Otterhampton, Pawlett and Puriton.

Features 
There are 14 listed buildings in West Huntspill.

History 
The parish was formed on 1 April 1949 from the parish of Huntspill when Huntspill was abolished and split into "East Huntspill and "West Huntspill".

References

External links 
 Parish council

Villages in Sedgemoor
Civil parishes in Somerset